Terence John Wright  (born 21 March 1963) is a former New Zealand rugby union player. A wing and fullback, Wright represented Auckland at a provincial level, and was a member of the New Zealand national side, the All Blacks, from 1986 to 1992. He played 64 matches for the All Blacks including 30 internationals. He was a member of the victorious New Zealand squad at the 1987 Rugby World Cup. Wright was known for his slim physique during his playing career. He also played for Sudbury RFC, Suffolk, U.K.

Wright is a trained accountant and has lived overseas for several years in Sydney, Tokyo, Hong Kong and Singapore with his wife and children.

References

1963 births
Living people
Rugby union players from Auckland
People educated at Northcote College
New Zealand international rugby union players
New Zealand rugby union players
Auckland rugby union players
Rugby union fullbacks
Rugby union wings
Male rugby sevens players